The 1904 Rutgers Queensmen football team represented Rutgers University as an independent during the 1904 college football season. In their first and only season under head coach Alfred Ellet Hitchner, the Queensmen compiled a 1–6–2 record and were outscored by their opponents, 202 to 16.  The team captain was Robert W. Cobb.

Schedule

References

Rutgers
Rutgers Scarlet Knights football seasons
Rutgers Queensmen football